Tanzverbot may refer to:
 A dancing ban, which in German is called a "Tanzverbot"
 Tanzverbot (Schill to Hell), a song by the German hip-hop group Fettes Brot and rock musician Bela B.
 Tanzverbot, a German YouTuber with over 1 million subscribers.